Adolfo Álvarez-Buylla Lozana (28 February 1897 - 1945) was a Spanish footballer who played as a defender for Athletic Madrid, Racing de Madrid and Zaragoza CD. Born in Asturias to a Spanish sociologist, pedagogue, jurist and professor of Krausism influence (Adolfo Álvarez-Buylla senior), he is the younger of three brothers, Benito, Plácido and Vicente, with the latter two also being footballers.

Biography
He began his career with Athletic Madrid in 1914, at the age of 17, playing with them for three years until he signed for Racing de Madrid in 1917, helping them win the 1918–19 Centro Championship, but the highlight of his footballing career came in the 1917 Prince of Asturias Cup, an inter-regional competition organized by the RFEF, in which he participated as a member of the Madrid national team, starting in two games as Madrid won their first-ever title in the competition, but this almost didn't happen as initially Buylla was not even in the radar of the dirigents to be called up for the Madrid team, but because the tournament coincided with the 1917 Copa del Rey Final between Madrid FC and Arenas, which prevented them from having the best players of Madrid FC, thus the "second options" (mainly players of Athletic Madrid and Racing de Madrid) got a chance to prove their worth at the tournament, and they did exactly that by winning what the "first options" had failed to.

Honours

International

Club
Racing de Madrid
Centro Championship
Winners (1): 1918–19

International
Madrid XI
Prince of Asturias Cup:
Champions (1): 1917

References

1897 births
1945 deaths
Footballers from Oviedo
Spanish footballers
Association football defenders
Atlético Madrid footballers